Member may refer to:

 Military jury, referred to as "Members" in military jargon
 Element (mathematics), an object that belongs to a mathematical set
 In object-oriented programming, a member of a class
 Field (computer science), entries in a database
 Member variable, a variable that is associated with a specific object
 Limb (anatomy), an appendage of the human or animal body
 Euphemism for penis
 Structural component of a truss, connected by nodes
 User (computing), a person making use of a computing service, especially on the Internet
 Member (geology), a component of a geological formation
 Member of parliament
 The Members, a British punk rock band
 Meronymy, a semantic relationship in linguistics
 Church membership, belonging to a local Christian congregation, a Christian denomination and  the universal Church
 Member, a participant in a club or learned society

See also